Monochamia is a genus of moths belonging to the family Tortricidae.

Species
Monochamia monochama Razowski, 1997

See also
List of Tortricidae genera

References

  1997: Euliini (Lepidoptera: Tortricidae) of Peru with description of New taxa and list of the New World genera Acta zool. cracov. 40 (1): 79-105

External links
tortricidae.com

Euliini
Tortricidae genera